Nurul Islam Moni is a Bangladesh Nationalist Party politician and the former Member of Parliament of Barguna-2.

Career
Moni was elected to parliament from Barguna-2 as an Independent candidate in 1988.

Moni was elected to parliament from Barguna-2 as an Independent candidate in 1991. He had received 19,616 votes while Golam Kabir of Awami League came second with 13,764.

Moni was elected to parliament from Barguna-2 as a Bangladesh Nationalist Party candidate in 2001. He had received 44,014 votes while his nearest rival Md. Golam Sarowar Hiru of Awami League got 24,772. Anowar Hossain Monju of Jatiya Party came third with 19,350. He received a plot in Chittagong City from the Bangladesh Nationalist Party government.

On 4 November 2007, Moni was sentenced to 14 years imprisonment in a corruption case by Barguna District court. His brother, Saiful Islam Jamal, was also sentenced to jail in the verdict. They went on the ran and surrendered to the Barguna court on 29 October 2008. Judge Md Musharraf Hossain sent them to jail upon surrender.

Moni sought nomination from Bangladesh Nationalist Party for Barguna-2 constituency for the 11th parliamentary election in 2018. The party nominated him for the election.

In September 2022, Moni's motorcade was attacked by Awami League activists injuring him and 50 activists of Bangladesh Nationalist Party.

References

Living people
People from Barguna district
4th Jatiya Sangsad members
5th Jatiya Sangsad members
8th Jatiya Sangsad members
Bangladesh Nationalist Party politicians
Year of birth missing (living people)